{{Infobox football club season
 | club               = New York Red Bulls
 | image              = NYRB wordmark 2line color ltbg.svg
 | season             = 2022
 | stadium            = Red Bull Arena
 | manager            = Gerhard Struber
 | mgrtitle           = Head coach
 | chairman           = Marc de Grandpré
 | chrtitle           = General Manager
 | league             = Major League Soccer
 | league result      = 6th
 | cup1               = MLS Cup Playoffs
 | cup1 result        = First round
 | cup2               = U.S. Open Cup
 | cup2 result        = Semi-finals
 | league topscorer   = Lewis Morgan (14)
 | season topscorer   = Lewis Morgan (17)
 | highest attendance = 25,219 (July 17)
 | lowest attendance  =  13,257(May 18)
 | average attendance = 17,002 
 | largest win        = TOR 1–4 RBNY (Mar. 5)    RBNY 4–1 DC (May 28)
 | largest loss       = ORL 5-1 RBNY (July 27, OC)
| pattern_la1   = _nyrb21h
| pattern_b1    = _nyrb21h
| pattern_ra1   = _nyrb21h
| pattern_sh1   = _adidaswhite
| pattern_so1   = _color_3_stripes_on_white
| leftarm1      = ffffff
| body1        = ffffff
| rightarm1    = ffffff
| shorts1       = E32636
| socks1        = E32636
| pattern_name2 = Secondary
| pattern_la2 = _nyrb22a
| pattern_b2 = _nyrb22A
| pattern_ra2 = _nyrb22a
| pattern_sh2 = _adidaswhite
| pattern_so2 = _color_3_stripes_white
| leftarm2 = E32636
| body2 = E32636
| rightarm2 = E32636
| shorts2 = E32636
| socks2 =E32636
 | prevseason  = 2021
 | nextseason  = 2023
 | American = true
}}

The 2022 New York Red Bulls season was the club's twenty-seventh season in Major League Soccer, the top division of soccer in the United States.

Due to the 2022 FIFA World Cup, the regular season began early on February 26, 2022 and ended on October 9. The team ended their season on  October 15, 2022 after losing to FC Cincinnati 1–2 in the MLS Cup Playoffs.

Team information
Squad information

Roster New York Red BullsAppearances and goals are career totals from all-competitions.''

Roster transactions

In

Out

Total expenditure: $1,325,000

Total revenue: $0

Net income: $1,325,000

Draft picks

Preseason and Friendlies
Preseason matches were announced on January 18, 2022. The last three matches held in February are part of the Coachella Valley Invitational which will be hosted by LA Galaxy.

Coachella Valley Invitational

Friendlies

Major League Soccer season

Eastern Conference

Overall

Results summary

Matches

MLS Cup Playoffs

U.S. Open Cup

Competitions summary

Player statistics

As of 15 October 2022.

|-
! colspan="14" style="background:#dcdcdc; text-align:center"| Goalkeepers

|-
! colspan="14" style="background:#dcdcdc; text-align:center"| Defenders

|-
! colspan="14" style="background:#dcdcdc; text-align:center"| Midfielders

|-
! colspan="14" style="background:#dcdcdc; text-align:center"| Forwards

|-
! colspan="14" style="background:#dcdcdc; text-align:center"| Left Club During Season

|}

Top scorers

As of 15 October 2022.

Assist Leaders

As of 15 October 2022.

Cleansheets

As of 15 October 2022

Disciplinary record 

As of 15 October 2022.

References

New York Red Bulls
New York Red Bulls
New York Red Bulls
New York Red Bulls seasons